NGC 965 is a spiral galaxy approximately 294 million light-years away from Earth in the constellation of Cetus. It was discovered by American astronomer Ormond Stone in 1886 with the 26" refractor at Leander McCormick Observatory.

Soviet/Russian astrophysicist Vorontsov-Velyaminov B. and Arhipova V. P. have noted in their "Morphological Catalogue of Galaxies" that NGC 965 "looks almost like two flattened galaxies i=I and i=III in contact and very disturbed".

See also 
 List of NGC objects (1–1000)

References

External links 
 
 SEDS

Spiral galaxies
Cetus (constellation)
965
9666
Astronomical objects discovered in 1886
Discoveries by Ormond Stone